Tomek Kolczynski, aka Kold, born 1973 in Gdańsk, Poland, is a Swiss musician, composer and sound designer.

Life 
Tomek Kolczynski studied audio design from 1997 to 2002 under Wolfgang Heiniger. He later studied free improvisation under Alfred Zimmerlin and Fred Frith from 2010– 2012 at the City of Basel Music Academy. 

During his studies, he produced Christian Zehnder's Popple Music album  (published by Sound Service Wigra in 2001). In 2005,  he published the Igloo album together with Stimmhorn music group, produced in cooperation with Theater Basel. Since 2006 he has composed for various German-speaking theatres, amongst them are: Theater Basel, Munich Kammerspiele, Burgtheater in Vienna, and various others in Zurich and Hanover. Since 2006, he regularly produces music for Edgar Hagen's documentary films. In 2015, he composed music for Feist – a computer game by Florian Faller and Adrian Stutz (Bits & Beasts).
Since 2013, he has been part of the BachSpace trio, together with pianist Tamar Halperin and violin player Etienne Abelin. Their debut album was published in September 2017 by the Berlin music label "Neue Meister".

Tomek Kolczynski lives in Basel, where he also teaches at the Music Academy since 2003.

List of projects (selection) 
 Theater music live
 2003 Faust II, Stadttheater Basel, Directed by Matthias Günther
 2006 Wir im Finale, Stadttheater Basel, Directed by Lars-Ole Walburg
 2010 Parzival, Schauspiel Hannover, Directed by Lars-Ole Walburg
 2011 Oops, wrong planet, Stadttheater Basel, Directed by Christian Zehnder
 2013 Peer Gynt, Schauspiel Hannover, Directed by Thomas Dannemann
 2014 Volksrepublik Volkswagen, Schauspielhaus Hannover, Directed by Stefan Kägi (Rimini Protokoll)
 Theater music compositions
 2007 Die Orestie, Düsseldorfer Schauspielhaus, Directed by Lars-Ole Walburg
 2007 Schwarze Jungfrauen, Burgtheater Wien, Directed by Lars-Ole Walburg
 2007 Die Probe, Münchner Kammerspiele, Directed by Lars-Ole Walburg
 2008 Kaspar Häuser Meer, Münchner Kammerspiele, Directed by Lars-Ole Walburg
 2010 Alkestis, Schauspiel Hannover, Directed by Tom Kühnel
 2010 Romeo & Julia, Schauspiel Hannover, Directed by Heike M. Goetze
 2012 Zwanzig Tausend Seiten (von Lukas Bärfuss), Schauspielhaus Zürich, Directed by Lars-Ole Walburg
 2013 Amphytrion, Schauspielhaus Zürich, Directed by Karin Henkel
 2015 Roberto Zucco, Schauspielhaus Zürich, Directed by  Karin Henkel
 2015 Floh im Ohr, Schauspielhaus Hannover, Directed by Thomas Dannemann
 2016 Die Reichsgründer oder das Schmürz, Schauspielhaus Hannover, Directed by Tom Kühnel
 2017 Medea, Schauspielhaus Hannover, Directed by Tom Kühnel
 2018 Weltzustand Davos, Schauspielhaus Zürich, Directed by Helgard Haug and Stefan Kägi (Rimini Protokoll)
 Soundtracks
 2006 Someone beside you, Documentary by Edgar Hagen
 2010 Charly‘s Comeback, TV-Film by Sören Senn
 2013 Reise zum sichersten Ort der Welt, Documentary by Edgar Hagen
 2015 Feist, Computergame by Florian Faller & Adrian Stutz
 Various Productions
 2000 Popple Music, CD, Zehnder with kold (Sound Service Wigra, 2001)
 2003 Talk with my Turntables, with Christian Zehnder
 2004 Igloo, CD, Stimmhorn & kold electronics (Make Up Your World, 2005)
 2005 Mozart Echos, Recomposed for Radio DRS2
 2006 Vastzapinside, CD-trilogy, kold
 2010 City pavilion Basel-Genf-Zürich, Sound Installation, Expo Shanghai, with Christian Zehnder
 2010 Mein Vogel, Soloperformance, First Showing Gare du Nord Basel
 2011 Lovie Lied, CD, with Gilbert Trefzger & Sandra Hüller
 2011 Requiem Reloaded, Installative Performance, with the Vocalensemble hark!, Basel/Genf/Zürich/Bern/Luzern
 2016 Ueberleben, Installative Performance, with the choir molto cantabile, Sonnenberg Lucerne
 2013 BachSpace, with Tamar Halperin & Etienne Abelin, First Showing Gare du Nord

References

External links 
 kold.ch Website
 bachspace.com Website

1973 births
Living people
Musicians from Gdańsk
Swiss composers
Polish emigrants to Switzerland